Because I Love You or The Dance Student is a 1928 German silent film directed by Johannes Guter and starring Fritz Alberti, Suzy Vernon, and Valerie Boothby.

The film's art direction was by Jacek Rotmil.

Cast

References

Bibliography

External links

1928 films
Films of the Weimar Republic
Films directed by Johannes Guter
German silent feature films
UFA GmbH films
German black-and-white films